The 1955 NCAA Cross Country Championships were the 17th annual cross country meet to determine the team and individual national champions of men's collegiate cross country running in the United States. Held on November 28, 1955, the meet was hosted by the newly renamed Michigan State University at the Forest Akers East Golf Course in East Lansing, Michigan. The distance for the race was 4 miles (6.4 kilometers).

Since the current multi-division format for NCAA championship did not begin until 1973, all NCAA members were eligible. In total, 5 teams and 60 individual runners contested this championship.

The team national championship was won by the Michigan State Spartans, their fourth. The individual championship was won by Charles Jones, from Iowa, with a time of 19:57.4.

Men's title
Distance: 4 miles (6.4 kilometers)

Team Result

References

NCAA Cross Country Championships
NCAA Men's Cross Country Championships
NCAA University Division Cross Country Championships
Sports competitions in East Lansing, Michigan
November 1955 sports events in the United States
Track and field in Michigan
Michigan State University